Healthy Children is an online magazine published quarterly by the American Academy of Pediatrics. The magazine was started in August 2012. Target audience is parents. It publishes topics related to children's health, guidelines on immunization, common illnesses in childhood, issues on behavior and development of children, and recommendations regarding children's fitness and nutrition. The magazine is published in English and Spanish languages.

References

Lifestyle magazines published in the United States
Quarterly magazines published in the United States
Health magazines
Magazines established in 2012
Parenting magazines
Spanish-language magazines
Downloadable magazines
Online magazines